Vera Leonidovna Biryukova (born 11 April 1998 in Omsk, Omsk Oblast, Russia) is a Russian group rhythmic gymnast. She is the 2016 Olympics Group all-around champion.

Career 
Biryukova was born in Omsk. She began gymnastics at five years old under the encouragement of her mother, her first coach was Natalia Glemba, she studied at the Omsk schools number 61 and 125 where she began training with Elena Arais and her mother Vera Shtelbaums.

Biryukova was briefly included as part of Russia's group however she was later relegated to the reserve team. It wasn't until in 2016 that she had her big breakthrough, Biryukova returned as member of the Russian national group after replacing Ksenia Poliakova, she began competing with the Russian group at the 2016 World Cup series in Kazan and Baku.

On August 19–21, Biryukova was member of the golden winning Russian group (together with Anastasia Maksimova, Maria Tolkacheva, Anastasia Bliznyuk, Anastasiia Tatareva) that won gold at the 2016 Summer Olympics held in Rio de Janeiro, Brazil.

Awards
 Honored Master of Sports of Russia (2016).
 Order of Friendship (August 25, 2016) - for outstanding sports achievements at the Games XXXI Olympiad in 2016 in the city of Rio de Janeiro (Brazil), manifested the will to win and sense of purpose.

Detailed Olympic results

References

External links
 
 
 
 

1998 births
Living people
Sportspeople from Omsk
Russian rhythmic gymnasts
Olympic gymnasts of Russia
Olympic gold medalists for Russia
Olympic medalists in gymnastics
Gymnasts at the 2016 Summer Olympics
Medalists at the 2016 Summer Olympics
Universiade medalists in gymnastics
Universiade gold medalists for Russia
Universiade bronze medalists for Russia
Gymnasts at the 2019 European Games
European Games gold medalists for Russia
European Games bronze medalists for Russia
European Games medalists in gymnastics
Medalists at the 2017 Summer Universiade
21st-century Russian women